The office of Captain General of Catalonia was created in 1713 by the Nueva Planta decrees of King Philip V of Spain to replace that of Viceroy of Catalonia.

List of Captains General of Catalonia

Under Philip V

Under Ferdinand VI

Under Charles III

Under Charles IV

Under Ferdinand VII

Under Joseph Bonaparte (Governor general)

French Empire

Under Ferdinand VII (restoration)

Under Isabella II

Provisional Government (1868–1871)

Under Amadeo I

First Republic

Provisional Government (1873–1874)

Under Alfonso XII

Under Alfonso XIII

Second Republic

Under Francisco Franco

Under Juan Carlos I

Región Militar Pirenaica

Inspector General of the Army

Footnotes 

1713 establishments in Spain
Captains General of Catalonia
Former subdivisions of Spain
History of Catalonia